In sequent calculus, the completeness of atomic initial sequents states that initial sequents  (where  is an arbitrary formula) can be derived from only atomic initial sequents  (where  is an atomic formula). This theorem plays a role analogous to eta expansion in lambda calculus, and dual to cut-elimination and beta reduction.

References 
 Gaisi Takeuti. Proof theory.  Volume 81 of Studies in Logic and the Foundation of Mathematics.  North-Holland, Amsterdam, 1975.
 Anne Sjerp Troelstra and Helmut Schwichtenberg.  Basic Proof Theory.  Edition: 2, illustrated, revised.  Published by Cambridge University Press, 2000.

Theorems in the foundations of mathematics
Proof theory